The 2011–12 Ohio Bobcats men's basketball team represented Ohio University during the 2011–12 NCAA Division I men's basketball season. The Bobcats, led by fourth year head coach John Groce, played their home games at the Convocation Center and are members of the East Division of the Mid-American Conference. They finished the season 29–8, 11–5 in MAC play to finish in third place in the East Division. They were champions of the MAC Basketball tournament and earned an automatic bid into the 2012 NCAA tournament where the 13th seeded Bobcats defeated Michigan in the second round and South Florida in the third round to advance to school's first Sweet Sixteen since 1964. They lost in the Sweet Sixteen to top-seed North Carolina in overtime. After the season Groce accepted the head coach position at Illinois

Roster

Coaching staff

Preseason
The preseason coaches' poll and league awards were announced by the league office on October 28, 2015.  Ohio was picked third in the MAC East.

Preseason poll
(First place votes in parenthesis)

East Division
 Kent State 132 (16)
 Akron 104 (8)
 Ohio 94
  80
 Buffalo 62
 Bowling Green 32

West Division
  128 (14)
 Ball State 111 (9)
  92 (1)
 Toledo 76
  59
 Eastern Michigan 38

Tournament champs
Kent State (12), Akron (6), Ball State (3), Western Michigan (2), Central Michigan (1)

Preseason All-MAC 

Source

Schedule

|-
!colspan=9 style=| Exhibition

|-
!colspan=9 style=| Regular Season

|-
!colspan=9 style=| MAC Tournament

|-
!colspan=9 style=| NCAA tournament

Statistics

Team Statistics
Final 2011–12 Statistics

Source

Player statistics

Source

Awards and honors

All-MAC Awards 

Source

National Awards

References

Ohio Bobcats men's basketball seasons
Ohio
Ohio
Bob
Bob